The 2001 season of the 3. divisjon, the fourth highest association football league for men in Norway.

Between 18 and 24 games (depending on group size) were played in 24 groups, with 3 points given for wins and 1 for draws. Twelve teams were promoted to the 2. divisjon through playoff.

Tables 

Group 1
Lillestrøm 2 – lost playoff
Grorud
Vålerenga 2
Lisleby
Råde
Rygge
Rælingen
Rolvsøy
Volla (-> FK Focus)
Vestli
Oppsal – relegated

Group 2
Follo – won playoff
Østsiden
Årvoll
KFUM
Navestad – relegated
Fredrikstad 2
Oslo Øst 2
Borgen
Torp
Bjerke
Leirsund – relegated
Lommedalen – relegated

Group 3
Kongsvinger 2
Nittedal – lost playoff
Brumunddal
Skjetten 2
Grue
Ringsaker
Høland
Aurskog/Finstadbru
Sørumsand
Eidskog
Kjellmyra – relegated
Flisa – relegated

Group 4
Moss 2
Sparta
Strømmen
Nordstrand
Haugerud
Skeid 2
Selbak
Drøbak/Frogn
Fjellhamar
Bækkelaget
Tistedalen – relegated
Korsvoll – relegated

Group 5
Frigg – won playoff
Trøgstad/Båstad
Kjelsås 2
Sarpsborg
Rakkestad
Fagerborg
Greåker
Spydeberg
Sander
Galterud
Bygdø – relegated
Nesodden – relegated

Group 6
Elverum – won playoff
Raufoss 2
Vardal
Ringebu/Fåvang
Ham-Kam 2
Trysil
Toten
Kolbu/KK
FF Lillehammer 2
Kvam
Lom
Sel/Otta – relegated

Group 7
Grindvoll – won playoff
Mercantile
Grei
L/F Hønefoss 2
Jevnaker
Holmen
Vang
Sør-Aurdal (-> SAFK Fagernes)
Lunner
Fart
Gjøvik-Lyn 2 – relegated
Rommen – relegated

Group 8
Strømsgodset 2
Birkebeineren – lost playoff
Fossum
Runar
Teie
Stokke
Åssiden
Falk
Slemmestad
Halsen – relegated
Drafn – relegated
Sandefjord – relegated

Group 9
Larvik Fotball – won playoff
Flint
Larvik Turn
Mjøndalen
Åmot
Vestfossen
Eik-Tønsberg 2 (-> Eik-Tønsberg 1)
Kongsberg
Tønsberg FK
Borre
Konnerud – relegated
Rjukan – relegated

Group 10
Jerv – won playoff
Langesund/Stathelle
Urædd
FK Arendal
Notodden
Skotfoss
Skarphedin – relegated
Herkules
Siljan
Brevik
Seljord
Langangen – relegated

Group 11
Vindbjart – lost playoff
Lyngdal
Start 2
Flekkerøy
Våg
Flekkefjord
Vigør
Søgne
Rygene
Kvinesdal
Giv Akt – relegated
Randesund – relegated

Group 12
Klepp – won playoff
Bryne 2
Eiger
Randaberg
Vardeneset
Vaulen
Tasta
Ulf-Sandnes
Egersund
Staal
Rosseland – relegated
Nærbø – relegated

Group 13
Vedavåg Karmøy – lost playoff
Ålgård
Åkra
Hundvåg
Hana
Torvastad
Haugesund 2
Figgjo
Sola
Kopervik
Skjold – relegated
Ganddal – relegated

Group 14
Radøy – lost playoff (-> Radøy/Manger)
Hald
Ny-Krohnborg
Gneist
Austevoll
Lyngbø
Arna-Bjørnar
Osterøy
Trane
Bergen Nord
Nordhordland – relegated
Frøya – relegated

Group 15
Brann 2 – won playoff
Askøy
Hovding
Vadmyra
Os
Trott
Follese
Bremnes
Varegg
Trio
Kjøkkelvik – relegated
Bjarg – relegated

Group 16
Stryn – lost playoff
Jotun
Fjøra
Sogndal 2
Sandane
Høyang
Saga
Dale
Eid
Kaupanger – relegated
Askvoll og Holmedal – relegated
Eikefjord – relegated

Group 17
Langevåg – lost playoff
Ørsta
Aalesund 2
Stranda
Velledalen og Ringen
Bergsøy
Vigra
Hareid
Volda
Brattvåg
Ha/No
Hovdebygda – relegated
Åram/Vankam – relegated

Group 18
Dahle – lost playoff
Kristiansund
Åndalsnes
Midsund
Sunndal
Gossen
Surnadal
Averøykameratene
Ekko/Aureosen
Bryn
Kvass/Ulvungen – relegated
Vestnes Varfjell – relegated

Group 19
Nidelv – lost playoff
Kolstad
Løkken
Orkla
Tynset
Buvik
Nardo
Malvik
Melhus
NTNUI
KIL/Hemne – relegated
Røros – relegated

Group 20
Levanger – won playoff
Tiller
Bangsund
Rørvik
Rissa
Varden – relegated
Selbu
Vinne
Namsos
Kvik
Bogen – relegated
Fosen – relegated

Group 21
Innstranden – lost playoff
Bodø/Glimt 2
Steigen
Mosjøen
Tverlandet
Brønnøysund
Sandnessjøen
Nesna
Leirfjord
Mo 2

Group 22
Vesterålen – won playoff
Skånland
Grovfjord
Flakstad – relegated
Medkila
Morild
Ballangen
Beisfjord
Høken
Melbo
Harstad 2 – relegated

Group 23
Salangen – lost playoff
Tromsø 2
Lyngen/Karnes
Senja
Fløya
Ramfjord
Ringvassøy
Tromsdalen 2
Kvaløysletta
Nordreisa
Ishavsbyen – relegated
Finnsnes 2 – relegated

Group 24
Porsanger – lost playoff
Kautokeino
Bossekop
Nordlys
Polarstjernen
Tverrelvdalen
Kirkenes
Honningsvåg
Nerskogen
Nordkinn
Sørøy Glimt – relegated

Playoffs

References
NIFS

Norwegian Third Division seasons
4
Norway
Norway